Sam Ask (16 October 1878 – 15 July 1937) was a Swedish screenwriter and actor. He also directed the 1928 silent comedy film Erik XIV.

Ask was a long-time student at Lund University, and enrolled as a law student in 1897 although he never graduated before he formally ended his university studies in 1909.

Selected filmography
 Kiss of Death (1916)
 The Outlaw and His Wife (1918)
 Synnöve Solbakken (1919)
 A Dangerous Wooing (1919)
 Robinson i skärgården (1920)
 Thora van Deken (1920)
 The Mill (1921)
 A Wild Bird (1921)
 A Fortune Hunter (1921)
 The Eyes of Love (1922)
 The Suitor from the Highway (1923)
 Iron Will (1923)
 House Slaves (1923)
 Little Dorrit (1924)
 Charley's Aunt (1926)
 The Devil and the Smalander (1927)
 Erik XIV (1928)
 The Girl from Värmland (1931)
 Adventure in Pyjamas (1935)

References

Bibliography
 Glavin, John. Dickens on Screen. Cambridge University Press, 2003.

External links

1878 births
1937 deaths
Swedish screenwriters
Swedish male film actors
Lund University alumni